Caradus is a surname. Notable people with the surname include: 

Edward Caradus (1885–1969), New Zealand analytical chemist, educator and administrator
Elizabeth Caradus (1832–1912), New Zealand suffragist, temperance and welfare worker

See also
Cardus (surname)